Eggkleiva is a village in the municipality of Skaun in Trøndelag county, Norway. It is located along Norwegian County Road 709, about halfway between the villages of Skaun and Børsa.

Eggkleiva sits on the northern shore of the lake Laugen.

References

Skaun
Villages in Trøndelag